3K or 3-K may refer to:

3Kingdoms, a MUD, or text-based online role-playing game
IATA airline designator for Jetstar Asia Airways
Ku Klux Klan
3K (Treći kanal RTS-a), a former channel of Radio Television of Serbia.
3K digital film resolutions, see List of common resolutions.
Kinder, Küche, Kirche
Kitanai, kiken, and kitsui (Dirty, Dangerous and Demeaning), a class of jobs
3000 (number)
3K, a Toyota K engine
3K Battery
SSH 3K (WA), see Washington State Route 128
3K radiation, see Cosmic microwave background radiation
PI-3K, see Phosphoinositide 3-kinase
Python 3K, see Python (programming language)
F6F-3K Hellcat, a model of Grumman F6F Hellcat
Mystery Science Theater 3K, see Mystery Science Theater 3000
3k, track and field shorthand for 3000 metres
EIF3K gene
Jetstar Asia's IATA designator.

See also

Three Kingdoms (disambiguation)
3000 (disambiguation)
K3 (disambiguation)